MV Maid of Ashton was a passenger ferry operated by Caledonian Steam Packet Company, initially on the Holy Loch service. Rendered redundant by the car ferry revolution, she was sold for a new career as a floating restaurant on the Thames, under the name Hispaniola.

History
Maid of Ashton was the first of a quartet of passenger vessels ordered in 1951 to modernise the Clyde fleet. She was the only Clyde passenger vessel ever built by Yarrow's naval yard at Scotstoun.

In May 1957, Princess Margaret took a cruise down river from Glasgow on Maid of Ashton.

With the switch to car ferry services, Maid of Ashton became redundant and was laid up in May 1971. In January 1973 she was sold to the Yardarm Club of London, as a floating club-house on the Thames Embankment. "Hispaniola", as she was renamed, was initially a private dining club, but later became a popular public restaurant. She was moved down river, to a berth close to an old Clyde consort, . In 2002, new owners, City Cruises had her refitted at the George Prior yard in Ipswich. She resumed business, under the shadow of the London Eye, with two decks of restaurant and function room facilities.

Layout
MV Maid of Ashton  had a forward observation lounge and an aft tearoom, both with large windows. A lower deck lounge was later converted to a bar. Open deck space available for passengers was limited. The bridge was forward on the promenade deck, with a landing platform above, for use at very low tides. She had a single funnel, over the central engines, with the galley aft. A main mast was added after launch, to comply with new light regulations. She was the first Clyde passenger ship to enter service with radar.

Service
MV Maid of Ashton operated the Holy Loch service from Gourock, with calls at Craigendoran, Kilcreggan, Blairmore, Kilmun and Hunters Quay. She was popular for her comfort and time-keeping superior to her predecessor, . In the late 1950s, the Maids lost their fixed routes and operated across the Clyde network.

References

External links
 http://hispaniola.co.uk/

Caledonian MacBrayne
Ferries of Scotland
1953 ships